"Do What You Like" is a single by British singer/songwriter and record producer Taio Cruz. The song was released as a digital download on 27 April 2015.

Music video
A music video to accompany the release of "Do What You Like" was first released onto YouTube on 27 May 2015 at a total length of three minutes and forty-three seconds.

Track listing

Release history

References

2015 songs
2015 singles
Taio Cruz songs
Songs written by Taio Cruz
Songs written by Clarence Coffee Jr.
Songs written by Marcus Lomax
Song recordings produced by the Monsters & Strangerz